Samia Ahmed Mohammed Adam (born 19 April 1996) is an Egyptian footballer who plays as a midfielder for Napoli and the Egypt women's national team.

Early life
Adam was born in Palo Alto, California and raised in Santa Clara, California.

High school and college career
Adam has attended the Santa Clara High School in her hometown and the University of the Pacific in Stockton, California.

Club career
Adam has played for El Gouna in Egypt. She later joined Galatasaray, then Italian club Napoli in September 2022.

International career
Adam capped for Egypt at senior level during the 2016 Africa Women Cup of Nations.

References

External links

1996 births
Living people
People with acquired Egyptian citizenship
Egyptian women's footballers
Women's association football midfielders
Women's association football defenders
Egypt women's international footballers
Egyptian people of American descent
Sportspeople from Palo Alto, California
Soccer players from California
Sportspeople from Santa Clara, California
American women's soccer players
Pacific Tigers women's soccer players
American sportspeople of African descent
American people of Egyptian descent
Galatasaray S.K. women's football players
Turkish Women's Football Super League players
Expatriate women's footballers in Turkey
Egyptian expatriate sportspeople in Turkey
S.S.D. Napoli Femminile players
Serie A (women's football) players
Egyptian expatriate sportspeople in Italy
Expatriate women's footballers in Italy